Sever is a rural locality (a village) in Kichmegnskoye Rural Settlement, Kichmengsko-Gorodetsky District, Vologda Oblast, Russia. The population was 23 as of 2002.

Geography 
Sever is located 15 km southeast of Kichmengsky Gorodok (the district's administrative centre) by road. Bolshoye Burtanovo is the nearest rural locality.

References 

Rural localities in Kichmengsko-Gorodetsky District